Gil Evans & Ten (also released as Big Stuff and Gil Evans + Ten) is the first album by pianist, conductor, arranger and composer Gil Evans as a leader, released on the Prestige label in 1957. It features Evans' arrangements of five standards and one original composition performed by Evans, Steve Lacy, John Carisi, Jack Koven, Jimmy Cleveland, Bart Varsalona, Willie Ruff, Lee Konitz, Dave Kurtzer, Paul Chambers, Jo Jones, Louis Mucci and Nick Stabulas. In 2003 a SACD version was published, with the first release of the stereo version.

Critical reception
The AllMusic review by Scott Yanow stated, "As good an introduction to his work as any, this program includes diverse works ranging from Leadbelly to Leonard Bernstein, plus Evans' own 'Jambangle.' The arranger's inventive use of the voices of his rather unusual sidemen make this a memorable set.". Writing for The Penguin Guide to Jazz, a critic observed, "It's a record somewhat overshadowed by the Impulse! and Verve sessions... but there's still plenty to listen to and enjoy".

Track listing
 "Remember" (Berlin) – 4:33
 "Ella Speed" (Lead Belly, Lomax) – 5:50
 "Big Stuff" (Bernstein) – 4:49
 "Nobody's Heart" (Rodgers, Hart) – 4:25
 "Just One of Those Things" (Porter) – 4:25
 "If You Could See Me Now" (Dameron, Carl Sigman) – 4:18
 "Jambangle" (Evans) – 4:57

Track 1 recorded on September 6, 1957; # 2, 4 and 6 recorded on September 27, 1957; tracks 3, 5 and 7 on October 10, 1957.

Personnel
Gil Evans – piano
Steve Lacy – soprano saxophone
Jack Koven – trumpet
Jimmy Cleveland – trombone
Bart Varsalona – bass trombone
Willie Ruff – French horn
Lee Konitz – alto saxophone
Dave Kurtzer – bassoon
Paul Chambers – bass
Jo Jones – drums (1)
John Carisi – trumpet (1)
Louis Mucci – trumpet (2–7)
Nick Stabulas – drums (2–7)

References 

1958 debut albums
Gil Evans albums
Albums arranged by Gil Evans
Prestige Records albums
Albums recorded at Van Gelder Studio